Feel the Power is the third and final studio album by glam metal band Blessed by a Broken Heart, released on January 24, 2012. The album was released through Tooth & Nail Records and was their first release to chart in the US Heatseeker Chart, debuting at No. 19.

Track listing

Personnel
 Tony Gambino – lead vocals
 "Shred" Sean Maier – lead guitar
 Sam Ryder – rhythm guitar, backing vocals
 Tyler Hoare – bass guitar, backing vocals
 Ian "Slater" Evans – drums, keyboards, backing vocals

References

Blessed by a Broken Heart albums
2012 albums